Sangita Dabir (born 22 January 1971) is an Indian former cricketer who played as a left-handed batter slow left-arm orthodox bowler. She appeared in four Test matches and 19 One Day Internationals for India between 1993 and 1997. She played domestic cricket for Vidarbha and Railways.

References

External links
 
 

1971 births
Living people
Cricketers from Nagpur
Indian women cricketers
India women Test cricketers
India women One Day International cricketers
Vidarbha women cricketers
Railways women cricketers